This list of museums in Bihar is a list of museums, defined for this context as institutions (including nonprofit organizations, government entities, and private businesses) that collect and care for objects of cultural, artistic, scientific, or historical interest and make their collections or related exhibits available for public viewing. Museums that exist only in cyberspace (i.e., virtual museums) are not included.

State Government Museums
This is a list of museums owned by State Government:

Central Government Museums
This is a list of museums owned by Central Government:

University Museums
This is a list of museums owned by Universities/Semi-Govt. Organisations:

Non-Govt. Organizations Museums
This is a list of museums owned by Non-Govt. Organizations (Trust, Society, etc.):

Private Museums
This is a list of museums run by private individuals:

See also

List of museums in India
International Museum Day

References

Museums in Bihar
B
Lists of tourist attractions in Bihar